2nd Independent Division of Anhui Provincial Military District was formed on September 6, 1966 from the Public Security Contingent of Anhui province. The division was composed of three regiments (4th to 6th).

From September 17, 1967 to November 1969 the division was put under command of 12th Army Corps. After that the division was returned to Anhui Provincial Military District's control.

The division was disbanded in March 1976.

References

IA2
Military units and formations established in 1966
Military units and formations disestablished in 1976